Tonya Linnette Lewis Lee (née Lewis; March 30, 1966) is an American film and television producer, author, entrepreneur, and advocate for women and infant health. Since founding her production company, Madstone Company Inc., in 1998, she has been involved in media for children, through her work with Nickelodeon and her authorship of children's books.

Life 

Lewis Lee was born in Yonkers, New York, to Lillian Charlotte (née Glenn) and George Ralph Lewis. Her father was a Philip Morris corporate executive. She graduated from Sarah Lawrence College with a BA and the University of Virginia School of Law with a JD. After practicing law at Nixon, Hargrave, Devans & Doyle LLP in Washington, D.C. for nearly two years, she returned to New York and married Spike Lee in 1993. They have two children.

Career

Film and television 
Lewis Lee has been producing content for television and film for nearly 20 years. She began her career producing interstitial programming for Nickelodeon. She went on to produce larger projects for them, ultimately producing the miniseries Miracle’s Boys for the network along with the documentary, I Sit Where I Want, commemorating the 50th anniversary of the Brown v. Board of Education decision.

In 2014, Lewis Lee co-founded the production company ToniK Productions with Nikki Silver. Since its founding, ToniK has produced several projects including The Watsons Go To Birmingham which Lewis Lee wrote, The Giver, She's Gotta Have It and MONSTER.

Writer 
Lewis Lee is the author of three children's books, Please Baby Please, Please Puppy Please, and Giant Steps to Change the World. She is also the co-author of the New York Times bestselling Gotham Diaries and the writer of the script, "The Watsons Go to Birmingham."

Advocacy 
Lewis Lee also served as the spokesperson for A Healthy Baby Begins With You an infant mortality awareness raising campaign out of the U.S. Department of Health and Human Services Office of Minority Health from 2007 to 2013. Through the campaign she traveled the US speaking on issues of women's health for the sake of their unborn children. She also produced the documentary film Crisis in the Crib: Saving Our Nation's Babies. Her work with this campaign inspired her to found Healthy You Now, a web platform for women's health.

In 2015 she founded Movita, an organic vitamin company that is sold through e-commerce.

Filmography

Film 
 The Watsons Go to Birmingham
 Monster
 Aftershock

Television series 
 I Sit Where I Want: The Legacy of Brown v. the Board of Education
 Miracle's Boys
 That's What I'm Talking About
 Crisis in the Crib: Saving Our Nations Babies
 She's Gotta Have It

Books 
 Please Baby Please
 Please Puppy Please
 Giant Steps to Change the World
 Gotham Diaries

Products 
 Movita Organics

References 

1966 births
Living people
Ladue Horton Watkins High School alumni
Place of birth missing (living people)
Sarah Lawrence College alumni
University of Virginia School of Law alumni
American women lawyers
American women novelists
American women writers
American women film producers
American women documentary filmmakers